Drao Kumar Riang  was a Tipra-Indian politician from Tripura. He won the election as a  Member of Legislative Assembly (MLA) representing Santirbazar in 1976. He also won in 1988 Tripura Legislative Assembly election from Kanchanpur Assembly constituency

He was one of the prominent leaders of Tripura Upajati Juba Samiti
which was merged with Indigenous Nationalist Party of Twipra.

References

Indian politicians
Tripura MLAs 1977–1983